Daddan Mishra (born 30 September 1969 in Bahraich UP)  is a former member of parliament the Bharatiya Janata Party and has won the 2014 Indian general elections from the Shrawasti (Lok Sabha constituency).

Political career 
Mishra won the 2007 assembly elections from Bhinga constituency in Shrawasti on a BSP ticket and was inducted in the ministry as the state minister of Medical Education. In 2012, he resigned from his post and all party activities and joined the BJP. He lost the 2012 Assembly election on the BJP ticket.

References

Living people
India MPs 2014–2019
1967 births
People from Bahraich district
Lok Sabha members from Uttar Pradesh
People from Shravasti district
Indian National Congress politicians
Uttar Pradesh MLAs 2007–2012
Bharatiya Janata Party politicians from Uttar Pradesh
Bahujan Samaj Party politicians
Dr. Ram Manohar Lohia Avadh University alumni